Cabidela or arroz de cabidela (cabidela rice) is a Portuguese dish made with poultry, usually a Rooster (chicken). It is typical of the northern Minho region. The particularity of the dish is that the hen's blood is added almost at the end, mixed with vinegar (so it doesn't clot) while the rice is boiling, much like "jugged" or "civet" dishes. The blood is captured when the animal is slaughtered and imparts a brown color to the dish. Occasionally, white rice can be served with the dish, although this is not common. Cooking with blood is an antique custom common to several ancient cultures; in Portugal, Cabidela has been found in written record since the 16th century and may equally be prepared with other fowl or animals (duck, turkey, pork, kid or game), though these are rare.

Variants

Variations on the dish is also popular in many of Portugal's former colonies, such as Macau, where a similar dish made with duck (pato de cabidela or pato à cabidela) is one of the most famous dishes in Macanese cuisine.

In Brazil, this dish is normally made with chicken (galinha à cabidela or galinha de cabidela), and is considered a typical dish of the city of Recife. The rice is cooked separately. It is also a very common dish in the state of Minas Gerais, where it has the name galinha ao molho pardo. It's also common to cook only the chicken's blood, with vinegar and vegetables, until it becomes a sauce that can be added to rice or to the cooked chicken itself.

In India, pork cabidela is popular among the Goan Catholic community of Goa.

The chicken version is one of the most common dishes served on special occasions while it is also found in restaurants in Angola.

References

Portuguese cuisine
Macanese cuisine
Blood dishes
Chicken dishes
Rabbit dishes